Men's Downhill World Cup 1995/1996

Final point standings

In Men's Downhill World Cup 1995/96 all results count.

Note:

In the last race only the best racers were allowed to compete and only the best 15 finishers were awarded with points.

References
 fis-ski.com

External links
 

World Cup
FIS Alpine Ski World Cup men's downhill discipline titles